Nuenonne ("Nyunoni") or Southeast Tasmanian, is an Aboriginal language of Tasmania in the reconstruction of Claire Bowern. It was spoken along the southeastern mainland of the island by the Bruny tribe.

Mainland Southeast Tasmanian is attested by 202 words collected by François Péron (1802) and by 573 words in various vocabularies collected by the D’Entrecasteaux expedition of 1792–1793 and published by Labillardière in 1800 and by Rossel in 1808. The French transcriptions of these sources differs from the English respellings seen in the records of other varieties of Tasmanian.

Truganini spoke Nuenonne.

References

Eastern Tasmanian languages
Languages extinct in the 19th century